Live from London is a live EP by R.E.M. that was recorded on March 26, 2008 and released exclusively on iTunes on July 1, 2008. It is one of several releases in the Live from London series.

Track listing
"Living Well Is the Best Revenge" (Peter Buck, Mike Mills, Michael Stipe) – 3:15
"Auctioneer (Another Engine)" (Bill Berry, Buck, Mills, Stipe) – 2:46
"Hollow Man" (Buck, Mills, Stipe) – 2:44
"Supernatural Superserious"(Buck, Mills, Stipe) – 3:22
"Fall On Me" (Berry, Buck, Mills, Stipe) – 2:48
"West of the Fields" (Berry, Buck, Mills, Stipe, Neil Bogan) – 3:13
"Horse to Water" (Buck, Mills, Stipe) – 2:18
"Man-Sized Wreath" (Buck, Mills, Stipe) – 2:35
"Man on the Moon" (Berry, Buck, Mills, Stipe) – 4:53
Tracks 1, 3, 4, 7 and 8 all from the album Accelerate.

Songs excluded
The following songs were performed and recorded, but not included with the iTunes release:
"Bad Day"
"Houston"† (available on the digital single for "Until the Day Is Done")
"Walk Unafraid"†
"I'm Gonna DJ"†

Personnel
R.E.M.
Peter Buck – guitar
Mike Mills – bass guitar, backing vocals
Michael Stipe – vocals

Additional musicians
Scott McCaughey – guitar, background vocals
Bill Rieflin – drums

Sales charts
The album debuted at 21 on Billboards Digital Albums.

See also
Vancouver Rehearsal Tapes
iTunes Originals – R.E.M.

References

External links
Photos from the show on Flickr

2008 EPs
iTunes Live from London (R.E.M. album)
R.E.M. live albums
R.E.M. EPs
Live EPs
2008 live albums
Albums produced by Mike Mills
Albums produced by Michael Stipe
Albums produced by Peter Buck